Irene Müller (born 13 August 1942 in Berlin) is a former East German pair skater who competed with partner Hans-Georg Dallmer.  They won the gold medal at the East German Figure Skating Championships in 1965 and 1968 and finished ninth at the 1968 Winter Olympics.  They finished fifth at the European Figure Skating Championships three times, and their best result at the World Figure Skating Championships was seventh in 1966.

Results
pairs with Dallmer

References
 

1942 births
Living people
Figure skaters from Berlin
German female pair skaters
Figure skaters at the 1968 Winter Olympics
Olympic figure skaters of East Germany